The 1971 Copa Interamericana was the 2nd staging of the competition. The final took place between Nacional (Winners of 1971 Copa Libertadores) and Cruz Azul (Winners of the 1971 CONCACAF Champions' Cup) and was staged over two legs on 15 July and 7 November 1972.

Since the winning of 1971 Copa Libertadores, some players of Nacional had been transferred, such as Atilio Ancheta, striker Luis Artime and Juan Mujica. Instead of acquiring new players from other clubs, National chose to promote players from the youth divisions to play the series v Cruz Azul. Some of them were Walter Mantegazza, Braulio Castro, Eduardo Gerolami, and Ruben Suárez.

On the other hand, the Mexican side had signed former Vélez Sarsfield goalkeeper, Argentine Miguel Marín, and Chilean back Alberto Quintano.

Nacional won its third International championship of the season after obtaining the 1971 Libertadores and the 1971 Intercontinental Cup on June and December 1971 respectively.

Qualified teams

Venues

Match details

First Leg

|}

Second Leg

References

Copa Interamericana
Copa Interamericana 1971
Copa Interamericana 1971
Football in Montevideo